Snøkuvbreen is a glacier in Nathorst Land at Spitsbergen, Svalbard. It is surrounded by the mountains of Kassen, Snøkuven and Juvtinden, and extends down to the valley of Danzigdalen. The glacier has a length of about six kilometers. It can be found at a Latitude of 77.7000000 and a Longitude of 16.3666700.

References

Glaciers of Spitsbergen